Tahrir Square Alexandria is a public town square in Alexandria, northern Egypt.

References 

Buildings and structures in Alexandria
Squares in Egypt
History of Alexandria
Tourist attractions in Alexandria